Malith Kumara (full name Heema Hewage Malith Kumara Silva; born 14 November 1989) is a Sri Lankan cricketer. He is a right-handed batsman and leg-break bowler who plays for Police Sports Club. He was born in Panadura.

Kumara has made a single first-class appearance for the side during the 2009–10 season, against Moratuwa Sports Club. He did not bat in the match, but bowled four overs, conceding 21 runs.

External links
Malith Kumara at ESPNcricinfo

1989 births
Living people
Sri Lankan cricketers
Sri Lanka Police Sports Club cricketers